Sargent or Sargents may refer to:

People
 Sargent (name), includes a list of people with the name

Places
Sargent, California
Sargents, Colorado
Sargent, Georgia
Sargent, Scott County, Missouri
Sargent, Texas County, Missouri
Sargent, Nebraska
Sargents, Ohio
Sargent, Texas
Sargent County, North Dakota
Sargent Icefield, Prince William Sound, Alaska
Sargent Township (disambiguation)

Other
CLIC Sargent, UK cancer charity

See also
Sargant (disambiguation)
Sergeant (disambiguation)
Justice Sargent (disambiguation)
Sarjeant (disambiguation)

ja:サージェント